Derek Savage is an Irish former Gaelic footballer who played at senior level for the Galway county team. He plays his club football with his local club Cortoon Shamrocks and was a member of the Galway senior team from 1998 to 2008. He is married to Caitriona since 2006.

References

1978 births
Living people
All Stars Awards winners (football)
Cortoon Shamrocks Gaelic footballers
Gaelic football forwards
Galway inter-county Gaelic footballers
People from Tuam
Winners of two All-Ireland medals (Gaelic football)